Anderson Motorsport is a Supercars team Currently competing in the Super 2 & Super 3 Series. The team was started by owner and team principal Michael Anderson to further his own racing career.

Super 2 Series 
The team was set to debut in the 2020 Dunlop Super 2 Series at the second round at Symmons Plains. However, due to the industry shutdown as a consequence of the 2020 Coronavirus Pandemic, They debuted with driver Tyler Everingham at the new second round at Sydney Motorsport Park. Everingham would finish 5th and 11th respectively in the 2 races. The team would not enter the Bathurst round of the series with Everingham, due to this, he would finish 14th in the championship having only competed in one round.

Kumho Tyre Series 
The teams racing debut was in the 2016 Kumho Tyres Australian V8 Touring Car Series with a BF Falcon for owner Michael Anderson, entered under the name of sponsor Kenwood Homes. Anderson had a solid debut season, taking 1 podium and finishing 7th overall in the championship. Anderson would have a breakout year in 2017,upgrading to a FG Falcon he would win 1 race, take 6 other podiums, as well as a pole position in the first race of the season at Phillip Island, he would finish 3rd in the championship.  Anderson's 2018 season was disappointing by comparison, He didn't take a podium all year, finishing 6th in the standings.

For 2019, Anderson would transfer to an ownership role, tabbing 2018 Australian Formula 4 Championship winner, Jayden Ojeda to drive the teams FG Falcon. Ojeda would have an outstanding rookie season, winning 4 races in a season long battle with fellow rookie Broc Feeney. Ojeda would ultimately finish second to Feeney by the end of the season.

For the shortened 2020 Super 3 Series, the team would enter debutant Declan Fraser. Fraser would take 3 podiums on the season, as well as pole position for the second race at Bathurst.

References 

Supercars Championship teams
Australian auto racing teams